Pepjei is one of the seven districts on the island of Rotuma, a dependency of Fiji. It includes the villages of Ujia, Uanheta, and Avave.

References

Districts of Rotuma